Petar Georgiev (born 21 July 1929) is a Bulgarian cyclist. He competed in the individual and team road race events at the 1952 Summer Olympics.

References

External links
 

1929 births
Possibly living people
Bulgarian male cyclists
Olympic cyclists of Bulgaria
Cyclists at the 1952 Summer Olympics